Mattia Tirelli (born 30 June 2002) is an Italian professional footballer who plays as a forward for Serie D club Brusaporto.

Club career
Formed in Feralpisalò youth system, Tirelli made his debut for the first team in 2018–19 Serie C season. On 6 October 2020, he was loaned to ACF Fiorentina Youth Sector.

On 5 November 2021 he was loaned to Serie D club Real Calepina.

References

External links 
 
 

2002 births
Living people
Sportspeople from the Province of Brescia
Italian footballers
Association football forwards
FeralpiSalò players
Serie C players
Serie D players